Jesmonite is a composite material used in fine arts, crafts, and construction.  It consists of a gypsum-based material in an acrylic resin. It was invented in the United Kingdom in 1984 by Peter Hawkins.

Usage
Jesmonite is a versatile material and is used in several ways.  It is typically used for creating sculptures and other three-dimensional works, but can be used with other materials as a ground for painting.  It can be used as a surface material in building and construction.  It is considered an attractive alternative to other resin-based materials, such as polyester and fiberglass.  It can be used for casting and laminating.  

Besides its popularity in sculpture, jesmonite is popular in other areas where casting and moulding are common, such as architectural stone and plasterwork that has a requirement to be very lightweight, taxidermy, archaeology, and palaeontology.

A 2016 Financial Times article described jesmonite's increasing use in interior design, seeing it as a natural-looking alternative to plastic for "high-end" goods.  In 2017, jesmonite was named "Material of the Year" by the London Design Fair.

Properties
Jesmonite is considered durable, flame resistant, and resistant to impact.  It can be used to fabricate both small and large objects.  When mixed, it accepts colored pigments and metal powders.  Its surface can be finished to resemble plaster, stone, metal, and wood. 

Jesmonite is considered a low-hazard material.  The finished composite emits no toxic fumes.  The mixing process requires no harmful solvents.  However, the mixing should be performed with rubber gloves, eye protection, and dust mask, and should take place in a well-ventilated area.  Cleanup is performed with water.

2012 Thames Diamond Jubilee Pageant
In the 2012 Thames Diamond Jubilee Pageant, the ornate prow sculptures on the Royal barges Gloriana and MV Spirit of Chartwell were carved and moulded in Jesmonite and decorated with gold leaf. These included dolphins, relief plaques and Old Father Thames.

A Spire
A Spire is a cast jesmonite sculpture by British-Japanese sculptor Simon Fujiwara, commissioned to stand outside the new Laidlaw Library of the University of Leeds, England, in 2015. The lower sections incorporate particles of coal, to acknowledge the city's early industries, and the upper stages show cables and leaves reflecting today's digital and natural world. The  cylindrical form relates to two nearby church spires on Woodhouse Lane.

References

External links
 Jesmonite official website
 Jesmonite Palestine Distributor website Woodberg
 Jesmonite North America Distributor website

Composite materials
Building materials
Ceramic materials
Architectural elements